Estadio Municipal Massami Uriu, also known as Gigante do Norte or Gigantão, is a multi-use stadium located in Sinop, Brazil. It is used mostly for football matches and hosts the home matches of Sinop Futebol Clube. Associação Atlética Sinop, a defunct club, also played its home matches at the stadium. The stadium has a maximum capacity of 25,000 people.

External links
Templos do Futebol
World Stadiums
Times Brasileiros

Gigante
Sports venues in Mato Grosso